Connecticut's 50th House of Representatives district elects one member of the Connecticut House of Representatives. It consists of the towns of Brooklyn, Woodstock, Eastford, Pomfret and Union. It has been represented by Democrat Pat Boyd since 2017.

List of representatives

Recent elections

2020

2018

2016

2014

2012

References

50